The Montreal Refinery is an oil refinery located in the city of Montreal inside the Rivière-des-Prairies–Pointe-aux-Trembles borough. The refinery is not far from the Montreal East Refinery. This refinery is the largest Suncor Energy refinery.

History 
The Montreal refinery was originally commissioned by Petrofina on September 15, 1955, with a throughput of 20,000 bpd. In the 1970's, expansion work was undertaken to bring capacity to 95,000 bpd. In 1981, the then Crown corporation Petro-Canada acquired the Montreal refinery as part of a government backed $1.6 billion deal to acquire all Petrofina's Canadian assets. The last major expansion of the refinery occurred in 2005 when Petro-Canada made the decision to close a smaller refinery operating in Oakville, Ontario and consolidate the Eastern Canada operations in Montreal. A very substantial investment in the Montreal refinery was made to expand the capacity of that facility to approximately 130,000 bpd. In 2009, Suncor Energy and Petro-Canada merged their operations. The new company is operated under the Suncor name for its general and trading purposes, and under the Petro-Canada trademark for its refined products and its retail and wholesale network.

See also 
List of oil facilities in Montreal

Oil refineries in Canada
Rivière-des-Prairies–Pointe-aux-Trembles
Industrial buildings and structures in Montreal
1955 establishments in Quebec